The 1940 North Dakota gubernatorial election was held on November 5, 1940. Incumbent Democrat John Moses defeated Republican nominee Jack A. Patterson with 63.11% of the vote.

Primary elections
Primary elections were held on June 25, 1940.

Democratic primary

Candidates
John Moses, incumbent Governor
C. P. Stone

Results

Republican primary

Candidates
Jack A. Patterson, incumbent Lieutenant Governor
Lewis T. Orlady

Results

General election

Candidates
John Moses, Democratic
Jack A. Patterson, Republican

Results

References

1940
North Dakota
Gubernatorial